In mathematics, an O*-algebra is an algebra of possibly unbounded operators defined on a dense subspace of a Hilbert space.

References

Operator algebras